Karydia can refer to the following populated places:
Karydia, Pella, in Pella regional unit, Greece;
Karydia, Rhodope, in the municipality Komotini, Rhodope regional unit, Greece;
San Pietro di Caridà (Greek Karydià) in Calabria, Italy.